Edwin Hoad (17 September 1870 – 1946) was a Barbadian cricketer. He played in one first-class match for the Barbados cricket team in 1896/97.

See also
 List of Barbadian representative cricketers

References

External links
 

1870 births
1946 deaths
Barbadian cricketers
Barbados cricketers
People from Saint Michael, Barbados